Friska Elisa Womsiwor (born 3 May 1995) is an Indonesian professional footballer who plays as a winger for Liga 2 club Persewar Waropen.

Club career

Persipura Jayapura
He made his professional debut in Liga 1 on April 18, 2017 against Persegres Gresik United.

On July 3, 2017 against Mitra Kukar, Friska scored a hat trick, with this result: Persipura Jayapura won over Mitra Kukar, 6-0 for Persipura. And Friska became the second player to score a hat trick in 2017 Liga 1. Previously, Madura United F.C. and Nigerian striker, Peter Odemwingie did the same thing when Madura United F.C. played against Semen Padang in the 11th week, and Madura United won 6-0 in Pamekasan.

Honours

Club
Persipura Jayapura
 Indonesia Soccer Championship A: 2016

References

External links
 Friska Womsiwor at Flashscore
 Friska Womsiwor at Soccerway

1995 births
Indonesian footballers
Persipura Jayapura players
Liga 1 (Indonesia) players
People from Manokwari
Association football wingers
Living people